Perth is the capital and largest city of the Australian state of Western Australia. It is the fourth most populous city in Australia and Oceania, with a population of 2.1 million (80% of the state) living in Greater Perth in 2020. Perth is part of the South West Land Division of Western Australia, with most of the metropolitan area on the Swan Coastal Plain between the Indian Ocean and the Darling Scarp. The city has expanded outward from the original British settlements on the Swan River, upon which the city's central business district and port of Fremantle are situated. Perth is located on the traditional lands of the Whadjuk Noongar people, where Aboriginal Australians have lived for at least 45,000 years.

Captain James Stirling founded Perth in 1829 as the administrative centre of the Swan River Colony. It was named after the city of Perth in Scotland, due to the influence of Stirling's patron Sir George Murray, who had connections with the area. It gained city status in 1856, although the Perth City Council currently governs only a small area around the central business district. The city's population increased substantially as a result of the Western Australian gold rushes in the late 19th century. It has grown steadily since World War II due to a high net migration rate. Post-war immigrants were predominantly from the British Isles and Southern Europe, while more recent arrivals see a growing population of Asian descent. Several mining booms in other parts of Western Australia in the late 20th and early 21st centuries saw Perth become the regional headquarters for large mining operations.

Perth contains a number of important public buildings as well as cultural and heritage sites. Notable government buildings include Parliament House, Government House, the Supreme Court Buildings and the Perth Mint. The city is served by Fremantle Harbour and Perth Airport. It was a naval base for the Allies during World War II and today, the Royal Australian Navy's Fleet Base West is located on Garden Island. All five of Western Australia's universities are based in Perth. 

The city has been ranked as one of the world's most liveable cities, and was classified by the Globalization and World Cities Research Network in 2020 as a Beta global city.

 Perth is divided into 30 local government areas and consists of more than 350 suburbs. Outside of the central business district, important urban centres within the metropolitan area include Armadale, Fremantle, Joondalup, Midland, and Rockingham. Most of those were originally established as separate settlements and retained a distinct identity after being subsumed into the wider metropolitan area. Mandurah, Western Australia's second-largest city, forms a conurbation with Perth along the coast, though for most purposes it is still considered a separate city.

Toponymy 
The name Perth was selected in recognition of Perth, Scotland as the birthplace of the Secretary of State for War and the Colonies, and Member for Perthshire in the British House of Commons, Sir George Murray. It was included in Stirling's proclamation of the colony, read in Fremantle on 18 June 1829, which ended "Given under my hand and Seal at Perth this 18th Day of June 1829. James Stirling Lieutenant Governor". The only contemporary information on the source of the name comes from Charles Fremantle's diary entry for 12 August 1829, which records that they "named the town Perth according to the wishes of Sir George Murray".

There is no equivalent Noongar terminology for the Perth metropolitan area; it is sited primarily on Whadjuk country, which extends approximately north to Two Rocks, south to Mandurah, and east as far as York. Boorloo (also transcribed as Boorlo or Burrell) referred to Point Fraser in East Perth, and means "big swamp", which describes the whole chain of lakes where the CBD and Northbridge are sited. However Boorloo is also used to denote the central business district, the local government area, or the capital city in general.

History

Prehistory 

Archaeological evidence demonstrates that the Noongar people have inhabited the Perth area for at least 45,000 years. Noongar country encompasses the southwest corner of Western Australia. The wetlands on the Swan Coastal Plain were particularly important to them, both spiritually (featuring in local mythology) and as a source of food.

The present-day location of the CBD forms part of the traditional territory of the Mooro, a Noongar clan, who at the time of British settlement had Yellagonga as their leader. The Mooro was one of several Noongar clans based around the Swan River, known collectively as the Whadjuk. The Whadjuk themselves were one of a larger group of fourteen tribes that formed the south-west socio-linguistic block known as the Noongar (meaning "the people" in their language), also sometimes called the Bibbulmun. 

On 19 September 2006, the Federal Court of Australia brought down a judgment finding that Noongar native title continued to exist over the Perth metropolitan area in the case of Bennell v State of Western Australia [2006] FCA 1243. An appeal was subsequently lodged and in 2008 the Full Court of the Federal Court upheld parts of the appeal by the Western Australian and Commonwealth governments. Following this appeal, the WA Government and the South West Aboriginal Land and Sea Council negotiated the South West Native Title Settlement, including the Whadjuk Indigenous Land Use Agreement over the Perth region, which was finalised by the Federal Court on 1 December 2021. As part of reaching this agreement, the Noongar (Koorah, Nitja, Boordahwan) (Past, Present, Future) Recognition Act was passed in 2016, recognising the Noongar people as the traditional owners of the south west region of Western Australia.

Early European sightings and exploration 
The Dutch Captain Willem de Vlamingh and his crew made the first documented sighting of the present-day Perth region by Europeans on 10 January 1697. They initially explored the area on foot, reaching what is now central Perth, having travelled up the Swan River. They named the river Swarte Swaene-Revier after the black swans of the area. Other Europeans made subsequent sightings and undertook further voyages of exploration of the area between this date and 1829, but as in the case of the observations made by Vlamingh, they adjudged the area inhospitable and unsuitable for the agriculture that would be needed to sustain a European-style settlement.

Swan River Colony 

Although the Colony of New South Wales established a convict-supported settlement at King George's Sound (later Albany) on the south coast of Western Australia in 1826 in response to rumours that  France intended to annex the area, Perth became the first "full-scale" settlement by Europeans in the western third of the continent of Australia in 1829. The British colony would be officially designated "Western Australia" in 1832 but was known informally for many years as the "Swan River Colony" after the area's major watercourse.

On 4 June 1829, newly arriving British colonists had their first view of the mainland, and Western Australia has subsequently celebrated a  public holiday on the first Monday in June each year. Captain James Stirling, aboard  Parmelia, noted that the site was "as beautiful as anything of this kind I had ever witnessed". On 12 August that year, Helen Dance, wife of the captain of the second ship, Sulphur, cut down a tree to mark the founding of the town. Beginning in 1831, hostile encounters between the British settlers and the Noongar people – both large-scale land users, with conflicting land-value systems – increased considerably as the colony grew. The hostile encounters between the two groups of people resulted in multiple events, including the murder of settlers (such as Thomas Peel's servant Hugh Nesbitt),
the execution of the Whadjuk elder Midgegooroo, the death of his son Yagan in 1833, and the Pinjarra massacre in 1834.

The relations between the Noongar people and the Europeans became strained due to these events. The increasing use of the land for agricultural purposes restricted the hunter-gatherer practices of the native Whadjuk Noongar. They were forced to camp around prescribed areas, including the swamps and lakes north of the European settlement area. Third Swamp, known to them as Boodjamooling, continued to be a main campsite for the remaining Noongar people in the Perth region and was also used by travellers, itinerants, and homeless people. By the gold-rush days of the 1890s, they were joined by miners who were en route to the goldfields.

Convict era and gold rushes 
In 1850, at a time when penal transportation to Australia's eastern colonies had ceased, Western Australia was opened to convicts at the request of farming and business people due to a shortage of labour. Over the next eighteen years, 9,721 convicts arrived in Western Australia aboard 43 ships.

Queen Victoria announced the city status of Perth in 1856. Despite this proclamation, Perth was still a quiet town, described in 1870 by a Melbourne journalist as:"...a quiet little town of some 3000 inhabitants spread out in straggling allotments down to the water's edge, intermingled with gardens and shrubberies and half rural in its aspect ... The main streets are macadamised, but the outlying ones and most of the footpaths retain their native state from the loose sand — the all pervading element of Western Australia — productive of intense glare or much dust in the summer and dissolving into slush during the rainy season."
With the discovery of gold at Kalgoorlie and Coolgardie in the late 19th century, Western Australia experienced a mining boom, and Perth's population grew from approximately 8,500 in 1881 to 61,000 in 1901.

Federation and beyond 

After a referendum in 1900, Western Australia joined the Federation of Australia in 1901. It was the last of the Australian colonies to agree to join the Federation, and it did so only after the other colonies had offered several concessions, including the construction of a transcontinental railway line from Port Augusta in South Australia to Kalgoorlie to link Perth with the eastern states.

In 1927, Indigenous people were prohibited from entering large swathes of Perth under penalty of imprisonment, a ban that lasted until 1954.

In 1933, two-thirds of Western Australians voted in a referendum to secede from the Australian Federation. However, the state general election held at the same time as the referendum had voted out the incumbent "pro-independence" government, replacing it with a government that did not support the independence movement. Respecting the result of the referendum, the new government nonetheless petitioned the Imperial Parliament at Westminster. The House of Commons established a select committee to consider the issue but after 18 months of negotiations and lobbying, finally refused to consider the matter, declaring that it could not legally grant secession.

Perth entered the post-war period with a population of approximately 280,000 and an economy that had not experienced sustained growth since the 1920s. Successive state governments, beginning with the Willcock Labor Government (1936-1945), determined to change this. Planning for post-war economic development was initially driven by Russell Dumas, who as Director of Public Works (1941-1953) drew up plans for Western Australia's major post-war public-works projects, including the raising of the Mundaring and Wellington Dams, the development of the new Perth Airport, and the development of a new industrial zone centred on Kwinana. The advent of the McLarty Liberal Government (1947-1953) saw the emergence of something of a consensus on the need for continuing economic development. Economic growth was fuelled by large-scale public works, the post-war immigration program, and the success that various state governments had in attracting substantial foreign investment into the state, beginning with the construction of the Anglo-Iranian Oil Refinery at Kwinana in 1951–52.

The result of this economic activity was the rapid growth of the population of Perth and a marked change in its urban design. Commencing in the 1950s, Perth began to expand along an extensive highway network laid out in the Stephenson-Hepburn Report, which noted that Perth was beginning to resemble a pattern of development less in line with the British experience and more in line with North America. This was encouraged by the opening of the Narrows Bridge and the gradual closure of the Perth-Fremantle Tramways. The mining-pastoral boom of the 1960s only accelerated the pace of urban growth in Perth.

In 1962, Perth received global media attention when city residents lit their house lights and streetlights as American astronaut John Glenn passed overhead while orbiting the earth on Friendship 7. This led to its being nicknamed the "City of Light". The city repeated the act as Glenn passed overhead on the Space Shuttle in 1998.

Perth's development and relative prosperity, especially since the mid-1960s, has resulted from its role as the main service centre for the state's resource industries, which extract gold, iron ore, nickel, alumina, diamonds, mineral sands, coal, oil, and natural gas. Whilst most mineral and petroleum production takes place elsewhere in the state, the non-base services provide most of the employment and income to the people of Perth.

Geography

Central business district

The central business district of Perth is bounded by the Swan River to the south and east, with Kings Park on the western end and the railway reserve as the northern border. A state and federally funded project named Perth City Link sank a section of the railway line to allow easy pedestrian access between Northbridge and the CBD. The Perth Arena is an entertainment and sporting arena in the city link area that has received several architectural awards from institutions such as the Design Institute of Australia, the Australian Institute of Architects, and Colorbond. St Georges Terrace is the area's prominent street, with a large amount of office space in the CBD. Hay Street and Murray Street have most of the retail and entertainment facilities. The city's tallest building is Central Park, the twelfth tallest building in Australia. The CBD until 2012 was the centre of a mining-induced boom, with several commercial and residential projects being built, including Brookfield Place, a  office building for Anglo-Australian mining company BHP.

Metropolitan area 

Perth is also the 50th least densely populated out of the 990 urban areas in the world with a population above 500,000.

The metropolitan region is defined by the Planning and Development Act 2005 to include 30 local government areas, with the outer extent being the City of Wanneroo and the City of Swan to the north, the Shire of Mundaring, City of Kalamunda and the City of Armadale to the east, the Shire of Serpentine-Jarrahdale to the southeast and the City of Rockingham to the southwest, and including Rottnest Island and Garden Island off the west coast. This extent correlates with the Metropolitan Region Scheme, and the Australian Bureau of Statistics' Perth (Major Statistical Division).

The metropolitan extent of Perth can be defined in other ways – the Australian Bureau of Statistics Greater Capital City Statistical Area, or Greater Perth in short, consists of that area, plus the City of Mandurah and the Pinjarra Level 2 Statistical Area of the Shire of Murray, while the Regional Development Commissions Act 1993 includes the Shire of Serpentine-Jarrahdale in the Peel region.

Geology and landforms 

Perth is on the Swan River, named for the native black swans by Willem de Vlamingh, captain of a Dutch expedition and namer of WA's Rottnest Island, who discovered the birds while exploring the area in 1697. This water body was known by Aboriginal inhabitants as Derbarl Yerrigan. The city centre and most of the suburbs are on the sandy and relatively flat Swan Coastal Plain, which lies between the Darling Scarp and the Indian Ocean. The soils of this area are quite infertile.

Much of Perth was built on the Perth Wetlands, a series of freshwater wetlands running from Herdsman Lake in the west through to Claisebrook Cove in the east.

To the east, the city is bordered by a low escarpment called the Darling Scarp. Perth is on generally flat, rolling land, largely due to the high amount of sandy soils and deep bedrock. The Perth metropolitan area has two major river systems, one made up of the Swan and Canning Rivers, and one of the Serpentine and Murray Rivers, which discharge into the Peel Inlet at Mandurah. The Perth-Gingin Shrublands and Woodlands and Banksia Woodlands of the Swan Coastal Plain straddle the metropolitan area.

Climate 

Perth receives moderate, though highly seasonal, winter-based rainfall. Summers are generally hot, sunny and dry, lasting from December to March, with February generally the hottest month. Winters are relatively cool and wet, giving Perth a hot-summer Mediterranean climate (Köppen climate classification Csa). Perth has an average of 8.8 hours of sunshine per day, which equates to around 3,200 hours of sunshine and 138.7 clear days annually, making it Australia's sunniest capital city.

Summers are dry but not completely devoid of rain, with sporadic rainfall in the form of short-lived thunderstorms, weak cold fronts and on occasions decaying tropical cyclones from Western Australia's northwest, which can bring heavy rain. Temperatures above  are fairly common in the summer months. On most summer afternoons a sea breeze, known locally as the "Fremantle Doctor", blows from the southwest, providing relief from the hot northeasterly winds. Temperatures often fall below  a few hours after the arrival of the wind change.

Winters are cool and wet, with most of Perth's annual rainfall between May and September. Winters see significant rainfall as frontal systems move across the region, interspersed with clear and sunny days where minimum temperatures tend to drop below . It occasionally gets cold enough for frost to form. While snow has never been recorded in the Perth CBD, light snowfalls have been reported in outer suburbs of Perth in the Perth Hills around Kalamunda, Roleystone and Mundaring. The most recent snowfall was in 1968.

The rainfall pattern has changed in Perth and southwest Western Australia since the mid-1970s. Perth was also hit by a severe thunderstorm on 22 March 2010, which brought  of rain and large hail and caused significant damage in the metropolitan area.

Isolation 
With more than two million residents, Perth is one of the most isolated major cities in the world. Perth is geographically closer to both East Timor, and Jakarta, Indonesia, than to Sydney.

Demographics 

Perth is Australia's fourth-most-populous city, having overtaken Adelaide in 1984. In June 2018 there were an estimated 2,059,484 residents in the Greater Perth area, representing an increase of approximately 1.1% from the 2017 estimate of 2,037,902.

Ancestry and immigration

At the 2021 census, the most commonly nominated ancestries were: 

Perth's population is notable for the high proportion of British- and Irish-born residents. At the 2021 Census, 169,938 England-born Perth residents were counted, ahead of even Sydney (151,614), despite the latter having well over twice the population.

The ethnic make-up of Perth changed in the second part of the 20th century when significant numbers of continental European immigrants arrived in the city. Prior to this, Perth's population had been almost completely Anglo-Celtic in ethnic origin. As Fremantle was the first landfall in Australia for many migrant ships coming from Europe in the 1950s and 1960s, Perth started to experience a diverse influx of people, including Italians, Greeks, Dutch, Germans, Turks, Croats, and Macedonians. The Italian influence in the Perth and Fremantle area has been substantial, evident in places like the "Cappuccino strip" in Fremantle featuring many Italian eateries and shops. In Fremantle, the traditional Italian blessing of the fleet festival is held every year at the start of the fishing season. In Northbridge every December is the San Nicola (Saint Nicholas) Festival, which involves a pageant followed by a concert, predominantly in Italian. Suburbs surrounding the Fremantle area, such as Spearwood and Hamilton Hill, also contain high concentrations of Italians, Croatians, and Portuguese. Perth has also been home to a small Jewish community since 1829  – numbering 5,082 in 2006 – who have emigrated primarily from Eastern Europe and more recently from South Africa.

A more recent wave of arrivals includes White South Africans. South Africans overtook those born in Italy as the fourth-largest foreign group in 2001. By 2016, there were 35,262 South Africans residing in Perth. Many Afrikaners and Anglo-Africans emigrated to Perth during the 1980s and 1990s, with the phrase "packing for Perth" becoming associated with South Africans who choose to emigrate abroad, sometimes regardless of the destination. As a result, the city has been described as "the Australian capital of South Africans in exile". The reason for Perth's popularity among white South Africans has often been attributed to the location, the vast amount of land, and the slightly warmer climate compared to other large Australian cities – Perth has a Mediterranean climate reminiscent of Cape Town.

Since the end of the White Australia policy in 1973, Asia has become an increasingly important source of migrants, with communities from Vietnam, Malaysia, Indonesia, Thailand, Singapore, Hong Kong, Mainland China, and India all now well-established. There were 112,293 persons of Chinese descent in Perth in 2016 – 5.3% of the city's population. These are supported by the Australian Eurasian Association of Western Australia, which also serves a community of Portuguese-Malacca Eurasian or Kristang immigrants.

Middle Eastern immigrants have a presence in Perth. They come from a variety of countries, including Saudi Arabia, Syria, Iran, Iraq, Israel, Lebanon, The United Arab Emirates, Oman, Yemen, and Afghanistan.

Perth also has one of the largest Latin American populations in Australia, with Brazilians and Chileans being the largest Latin American groups in Perth.

The Indian community includes a substantial number of Parsees who emigrated from Bombay – Perth being the closest Australian city to India – in 2021 those with Indian ancestry accounted for 3.5% of Perth's population Perth is also home to the largest population of Anglo-Burmese in the world; many settled here following the independence of Burma in 1948 with immigration taking off after 1962. The city is now the cultural hub for Anglo-Burmese worldwide. There is also a substantial Anglo-Indian population in Perth, who also settled in the city following the independence of India.

At the 2021 census, 2% of Perth's population identified as being Aboriginal and/or Torres Strait Islander.

Language
At the 2016 census, 73.5% of inhabitants spoke only English at home, with the next most common languages being Mandarin (2.3%), Italian (1.4%), Vietnamese (1.0%), Cantonese (1.0%) and Arabic (0.7%).

Religion

32.1% of the 2016 census respondents in Perth had no religion, as against 29.6% of national population. In 1911, the national figure was 0.4%.

Catholics are the largest single Christian denomination in the Greater Perth area at 22%.   The Personal Ordinariate of Our Lady of the Southern Cross claims over 2,000 members. Perth is the seat of the Roman Catholic Archdiocese of Perth.  Anglicans are 13.8% of the population. Perth is the seat of the Anglican Diocese of Perth.

Buddhism and Islam each have more than 40,000 adherents. Over 39,000 members of the Uniting Church in Australia live in Perth. Perth has the third largest Jewish population in Australia, numbering approximately 20,000, with both Orthodox and Progressive synagogues and a Jewish Day School. The Baháʼí community in Perth numbers around 1,500. Hinduism has over 20,000 adherents in Perth; the Diwali (festival of lights) celebration in 2009 attracted over 20,000 visitors. There are Hindu temples in Canning Vale, Anketell and a Swaminarayan temple in Bennett Springs. Hinduism is the fastest growing religion in Australia. Perth is also home to 12,000 Mormons and the Perth Australia Temple of the Church of Jesus Christ of Latter-day Saints.

Governance 

Perth, like the rest of Australia, is governed by three levels of government: local, state, and federal.

Local

The Perth metropolitan area is divided into thirty local government bodies, including the City of Perth which administers Perth's central business district. The outer extent of the administrative region of Perth comprises the City of Wanneroo and the City of Swan to the north, the Shire of Mundaring, City of Kalamunda and the City of Armadale to the east, the Shire of Serpentine-Jarrahdale to the southeast and the City of Rockingham to the southwest, and including the islands of Rottnest Island and Garden Island off the west coast.

State

Perth houses the Parliament of Western Australia and the Governor of Western Australia. , 42 of the Legislative Assembly's 59 seats and 18 of the Legislative Council's 36 seats are based in Perth's metropolitan area.

The state's highest court, the Supreme Court, is located in Perth, along with the District and Family Courts. The Magistrates' Court has six metropolitan locations.

Federal

Perth is represented by 10 full seats and significant parts of three others in the Federal House of Representatives, with the seats of Canning, Pearce, and Brand including some areas outside the metropolitan area.

The Federal Court of Australia and the Federal Circuit Court of Australia (previously the Federal Magistrates Court) occupy the Commonwealth Law Courts building on Victoria Avenue, which is also the location for annual Perth sittings of Australia's High Court.

Economy 

By virtue of its population and role as the administrative centre for business and government, Perth dominates the Western Australian economy, despite the major mining, petroleum, and agricultural export industries being located elsewhere in the state. Perth's function as the state's capital city, its economic base and population size have also created development opportunities for many other businesses oriented to local or more diversified markets.
Perth's economy has been changing in favour of the service industries since the 1950s. Although one of the major sets of services it provides is related to the resources industry and, to a lesser extent, agriculture, most people in Perth are not connected to either; they have jobs that provide services to other people in Perth.

As a result of Perth's relative geographical isolation, it has never had the necessary conditions to develop significant manufacturing industries other than those serving the immediate needs of its residents, mining, agriculture and some specialised areas, such as, in recent times, niche shipbuilding and maintenance. It was simply cheaper to import all the needed manufactured goods from either the eastern states or overseas.

Industrial employment influenced the economic geography of Perth. After WWII, Perth experienced suburban expansion aided by high levels of car ownership. Workforce decentralisation and transport improvements made it possible for the establishment of small-scale manufacturing in the suburbs. Many firms took advantage of relatively cheap land to build spacious, single-storey plants in suburban locations with plentiful parking, easy access and minimal traffic congestion. "The former close ties of manufacturing with near-central and/or rail-side locations were loosened."

Industrial estates such as Kwinana, Welshpool and Kewdale were post-war additions contributing to the growth of manufacturing south of the river. The establishment of the Kwinana industrial area was supported by standardisation of the east–west rail gauge linking Perth with eastern Australia. Since the 1950s the area has been dominated by heavy industry, including an oil refinery, steel-rolling mill with a blast furnace, alumina refinery, power station, and a nickel refinery. Another development, also linked with rail standardisation, was in 1968 when the Kewdale Freight Terminal was developed adjacent to the Welshpool industrial area, replacing the former Perth railway yards.

With significant population growth post-WWII, employment growth occurred not in manufacturing but in retail and wholesale trade, business services, health, education, community and personal services, and in public administration. Increasingly it was these services sectors, concentrated around the Perth metropolitan area, that provided jobs.

Perth has also become a hub of technology-focused startups since the early 2000s that provide a pool of highly skilled jobs to the Perth community. Companies such as Appbot, Agworld, Touchgram, and Healthengine all hail from Perth and have made headlines internationally. Programs like StartupWA and incubators such as Spacecubed and Vocus Upstart are all focused on creating a thriving startup culture in Perth and growing the next generation of Perth-based employers.

Education 

Education is compulsory in Western Australia between the ages of six and seventeen, corresponding to primary and secondary school. Tertiary education is available through several universities and technical and further education (TAFE) colleges.

Primary and secondary 
Students may attend either public schools, run by the state government's Department of Education, or private schools, usually associated with a religion.

The Western Australian Certificate of Education (WACE) is the credential given to students who have completed Years 11 and 12 of their secondary schooling.

In 2012 the minimum requirements for students to receive their WACE changed.

Tertiary 

Perth is home to four public universities: the University of Western Australia, Curtin University, Murdoch University, and Edith Cowan University. There is also one private university, the University of Notre Dame Australia, and a local campus of the Melbourne-based University of Divinity.

The University of Western Australia, which was founded in 1911, is renowned as one of Australia's leading research institutions. The university's monumental neo-classical architecture, most of which is carved from white limestone, is a notable tourist destination in the city. It is the only university in the state to be a member of the Group of Eight, as well as the Sandstone universities. It is also the state's only university to have produced a Nobel Laureate: Barry Marshall, who graduated with a Bachelor of Medicine, Bachelor of Surgery in 1975 and was awarded a joint Nobel Prize in physiology or medicine in 2005 with Robin Warren.

Curtin University, previously known as Western Australian Institute of Technology (1966-1986) and Curtin University of Technology (1986-2010), is Western Australia's largest university by student population.

Murdoch University was founded in 1973 and incorporates Western Australia's only veterinary school and, until its controversial closure in 2020, Australia's only theology programme to be completely integrated into a secular university.

Edith Cowan University was established in 1991 from the existing Western Australian College of Advanced Education which itself was formed on 11 December 1981 from the existing Teachers Colleges at Claremont, Nedlands, Churchlands, and Mount Lawley after Graylands had merged into Claremont, Churchlands and Mount Lawley in 1979. It incorporates the Western Australian Academy of Performing Arts.

The University of Notre Dame Australia was established in 1990. Notre Dame was established as a Catholic university with its lead campus in Fremantle and a large campus in Sydney. Its campus is in the west end of Fremantle, using historic port buildings built in the 1890s, giving Notre Dame a distinct European university atmosphere.

The Melbourne-based University of Divinity established a campus in Perth in 2022 through its admission of Wollaston College, the theological college of the Anglican Diocese of Perth, as a collegiate college of the University.

Colleges of TAFE provide trade and vocational training, including certificate- and diploma-level courses. TAFE began as a system of technical colleges and schools under the Education Department, from which they were separated in the 1980s and ultimately formed into regional colleges. Two are in the Perth metropolitan area: North Metropolitan TAFE (formerly Central Institute of Technology and West Coast Institute of Training); and South Metropolitan TAFE (formerly Polytechnic West and Challenger Institute of Technology).

Media

Newspapers
The main newspapers for Perth are The West Australian and The Sunday Times. Localised free community papers cater to each local government area. The local business paper is Western Australian Business News.

Radio
Radio stations are on AM, FM and DAB+ frequencies. ABC stations include ABC News (585AM), 720 ABC Perth, Radio National (810AM), Classic FM (97.7FM) and Triple J (99.3FM). The six local commercial stations are 882 6PR and 1080 6IX on AM; Triple M Perth (92.9FM), Nova 93.7, Mix94.5, and 96FM on FM. DAB+ has mostly the same as both AM and FM plus national stations from the ABC/SBS, Radar Radio and Novanation, along with local stations My Perth Digital, Hot Country Perth, and 98five Christian radio. Major community radio stations include RTRFM (92.1FM), Sonshine FM (98.5FM), SportFM (91.3FM) and Curtin FM (100.1FM).

Television
Perth is served by thirty digital free-to-air television channels:

 ABC TV
 ABC TV HD (ABC TV broadcast in HD)
 ABC TV Plus
 ABC Me
 ABC News
 SBS
 SBS HD (SBS broadcast in HD)
 SBS Viceland
 SBS World Movies
 SBS Food
 NITV
 SBS WorldWatch
 Seven
 7HD (Seven broadcast in HD)
 7Two
 7mate 
 7mate HD (7Mate broadcast in HD)
 7flix
 Racing.com
 Nine
 9HD (Nine broadcast in HD)
 9Gem
 9Gem HD (9Gem broadcast in HD)
 9Go!
 9Life
 9Rush
 10
 10 HD (10 broadcast in HD)
 10 Bold (only in HD)
 10 Peach
 10 Shake
 TVSN
 Gecko TV (formerly Spree TV)

ABC, SBS, Seven, Nine and 10 were also broadcast in an analogue format until 16 April 2013, when the analogue transmission was switched off. Community station Access 31 closed in August 2008. In April 2010 a new community station, West TV, began transmission (in digital format only). West TV ceased broadcasting in February 2020.

Foxtel provides a subscription-based satellite and cable television service. Perth has its own local newsreaders on ABC (Pamela Medlen), Seven (Rick Ardon, Susannah Carr), Nine (Michael Thomson, Monika Kos) and Ten (Natalie Forrest).

An annual telethon has been broadcast since 1968 to raise funds for charities including Princess Margaret Hospital for Children. The 24-hour Perth Telethon claims to be "the most successful fundraising event per capita in the world"

Online-only
Online news media covering the Perth area include TheWest.com.au backed by The West Australian, Perth Now from the newsroom of The Sunday Times, and WAToday from Nine Entertainment.

Culture and sport

Arts and entertainment 

A number of annual cultural events are held in Perth. Held annually since 1953, Perth Festival is Australia's longest running annual cultural festival, and includes the Perth Writers Festival and the Winter Arts Festival. The Fringe World Festival has been held annually across January and February in Perth since 2012. Perth also hosts annual music festivals including Listen Out, Origin and St Jerome's Laneway Festival. The Perth International Comedy Festival features a variety of local and international comedic talent, with performances held at the Astor Theatre and nearby venues in Mount Lawley, and regular night food markets throughout the summer months across Perth and its surrounding suburbs. Sculpture by the Sea showcases a range of local and international sculptors' creations along Cottesloe Beach. There is also a wide variety of public art and sculptures on display across the city, throughout the year.

The Perth Cultural Centre is home to many of the city's major arts, cultural and educational institutions, including the Art Gallery of Western Australia, Western Australian Museum, State Library of Western Australia, State Records Office, and Perth Institute of Contemporary Arts (PICA). The State Theatre Centre of Western Australia is also located there, and is the home of the Black Swan State Theatre Company and the Perth Theatre Company. Other performing arts companies based in Perth include the West Australian Ballet, the West Australian Opera and the West Australian Symphony Orchestra, all of which present regular programmes. The Western Australian Youth Orchestras provide young musicians with performance opportunities in orchestral and other musical ensembles.

Perth is also home to the Western Australian Academy of Performing Arts at Edith Cowan University, from which many actors and broadcasters have launched their careers. The city's main performance venues include the Riverside Theatre within the Perth Convention Exhibition Centre, the Perth Concert Hall, the historic His Majesty's Theatre, the Regal Theatre in Subiaco and the Astor Theatre in Mount Lawley. Perth Arena can be configured as an entertainment or sporting arena, and concerts are also hosted at other sporting venues, including Optus Stadium, HBF Stadium, and nib Stadium. Outdoor concert venues include Quarry Amphitheatre, Supreme Court Gardens, Kings Park and Russell Square.

The largest performance area within the State Theatre Centre, the Heath Ledger Theatre, is named in honour of Perth-born film actor Heath Ledger. Other performers born and raised in Perth include
Judy Davis and Melissa George. Performers raised in Perth include Tim Minchin, Lisa McCune, Troye Sivan and Isla Fisher. Performers that studied in Perth at the Western Australian Academy of Performing Arts include Hugh Jackman and Lisa McCune.

Due to Perth's relative isolation from other Australian cities, overseas performing artists sometimes exclude it from their Australian tour schedules. This isolation, however, has helped foster a strong local music scene, with many local music groups. Famous musical performers from Perth include the late AC/DC frontman Bon Scott, whose heritage-listed grave at Fremantle Cemetery is reportedly the most visited grave in Australia. Perth-born performer and artist Rolf Harris became known by the nickname "The Boy From Bassendean". Further notable music acts from Perth include The Triffids, The Scientists, The Drones, Tame Impala, and Karnivool.

Perth has inspired various artistic and cultural works. John Boyle O'Reilly, a Fenian convict transported to Western Australia, published Moondyne in 1879, the most famous early novel about the Swan River Colony. Perth is also the setting for various works by novelist Tim Winton, most notably Cloudstreet (1991). Songs that refer to the city include "I Love Perth" (1996) by Pavement, "Perth" (2011) by Bon Iver, and "Perth" (2015) by Beirut. Films shot or set in Perth include Japanese Story (2003), These Final Hours (2013), Kill Me Three Times (2014) and Paper Planes (2015).

Tourism and recreation 

Tourism is an important part of Perth's economy, with approximately 2.8 million domestic visitors and 0.7 million international visitors in the year ending March 2012. Tourist attractions are generally focused around the city centre, Fremantle, the coast, and the Swan River.
In addition to the Perth Cultural Centre, there are dozens of museums across the city. Scitech also conducts live science demonstration shows and operates the adjacent Horizon planetarium. The Western Australian Maritime Museum in Fremantle displays maritime objects from all eras. It houses Australia II, the yacht that won the 1983 America's Cup, as well as a former Royal Australian Navy submarine. Also in Fremantle is the Army Museum of Western Australia, situated within a historic artillery barracks. The museum consists of several galleries that reflect the Army's involvement in Western Australia and the military service of Western Australians. The museum holds numerous items of significance, including three Victoria Crosses. Aviation history is represented by the Aviation Heritage Museum in Bull Creek, with its significant collection of aircraft, including a Lancaster bomber and a Catalina of the type operated from the Swan River during WWII.

There are many heritage sites in Perth's CBD, Fremantle, and other parts of the metropolitan areas. Some of the oldest remaining buildings, dating back to the 1830s, include the Round House in Fremantle, the Old Mill in South Perth, and the Old Court House in the city centre. Registers of important buildings are maintained by the Heritage Council of Western Australia and local governments. A late heritage building is the Perth Mint. Yagan Square connects Northbridge and the Perth CBD, with a 45-metre-high digital tower and the 9-metre statue "Wirin" designed by Noongar artist Tjyllyungoo. Elizabeth Quay is also a notable attraction in Perth, featuring Swan Bells, a panoramic view of Swan River, and the sculpture Spanda by artist Christian de Vietri.

Retail shopping in the Perth CBD is focused around Murray Street and Hay Street. Both these streets are pedestrian malls between William Street and Barrack Street. Forrest Place is another pedestrian mall, connecting the Murray Street mall to Wellington Street and the Perth railway station. A number of arcades run between Hay Street and Murray Street, including the Piccadilly Arcade, which housed the Piccadilly Cinema until it closed in late 2013. Other shopping precincts include Watertown in West Perth, featuring factory outlets for major brands, the historically significant Fremantle Markets, which date to 1897, and the Midland townsite on Great Eastern Highway, combining historic development around the Town Hall and Post Office buildings with the modern Midland Gate shopping centre further east. Joondalup's central business district is largely a shopping and retail area lined with townhouses and apartments, and also features Lakeside Joondalup Shopping City. Joondalup was granted the status of "tourism precinct" by the State Government in 2009, allowing for extended retail trading hours.

Restaurants, bars and nightclubs can be found in the entertainment hubs of Northbridge (just north of the Perth CBD), the west end of the CBD itself, Elizabeth Quay, Leederville, Scarborough and Fremantle. The Crown casino and resort is located at Burswood.

The Swan Valley, with fertile soil, uncommon in the Perth region, features numerous wineries, such as the large complex at Houghtons, the state's biggest producer, Sandalfords and many smaller operators, including microbreweries and rum distilleries. The Swan Valley also contains specialised food producers, many restaurants and cafes, and roadside local produce stalls that sell seasonal fruit throughout the year. Tourist Drive 203 is a circular route in the Swan Valley, passing by many attractions on West Swan Road and Great Northern Highway.

It has many landmarks and attractions, including the State War Memorial Precinct on Mount Eliza, Western Australian Botanic Garden, and children's playgrounds.

Avon Valley, John Forrest and Yanchep national parks are areas of protected bushland at the northern and eastern edges of the metropolitan area. Within the city's northern suburbs is Whiteman Park, a  bushland area, with bushwalking trails, bike paths, sports facilities, playgrounds, a vintage tramway, a light railway on a  track, motor and tractor museums, and Caversham Wildlife Park.

Perth Zoo, in South Perth, houses a variety of Australian and exotic animals from around the globe. The zoo is home to highly successful breeding programs for orangutans and giraffes, and participates in captive breeding and reintroduction efforts for a number of Western Australian species, including the numbat, the dibbler, the chuditch, and the western swamp tortoise.

More wildlife can be observed at the Aquarium of Western Australia in Hillarys, Australia's largest aquarium, specialising in marine animals that inhabit the  western coast of Australia. The northern Perth section of the coastline is known as Sunset Coast; it includes numerous beaches and the Marmion Marine Park, a protected area inhabited by tropical fish, Australian sea lions and bottlenose dolphins, and traversed by humpback whales. Tourist Drive 204, also known as Sunset Coast Tourist Drive, is a designated route from North Fremantle to Iluka along coastal roads.

Sport 

The climate of Perth allows for extensive outdoor sporting activity, and this is reflected in the wide variety of sports available to residents of the city. Perth was host to the 1962 Commonwealth Games and the 1987 America's Cup defence (based at Fremantle). Australian rules football is the most popular spectator sport in Perth – nearly 23% of Western Australians attended a match at least once in 2009–2010. The two Australian Football League teams located in Perth, the West Coast Eagles and the Fremantle Football Club, have two of the largest fan bases in the country. The Eagles, the older club, is one of the most successful teams in the league, and one of the largest sporting clubs in Australia. The next level of football is the Western Australian Football League, comprising nine clubs each having a League, Reserves, and Colts team. Each of these clubs has a junior football system for ages 7 to 17. The next level of Australian rules football is the Perth Football League, comprising 68 clubs servicing senior footballers within the metropolitan area. Other popular sports include cricket, basketball, soccer, and rugby union.

Perth has hosted numerous state and international sporting events. Ongoing international events include the ATP Cup (replacing the Hopman Cup in 2020) during the first week of January at the Perth Arena, and the Perth International golf tournament at Lake Karrinyup Country Club. In addition to these Perth has hosted the Rally Australia of the World Rally Championships from 1989 to 2006, international Rugby Union games, including qualifying and pool stage matches for the 2003 Rugby World Cup and the Bledisloe Cup in 2019. The 1991 and 1998 FINA World Championships were held in Perth.
Four races (2006, 2007, 2008, and 2010) in the Red Bull Air Race World Championship have been held on a stretch of the Swan River called Perth Water, using Langley Park as a temporary airfield. Several motorsport facilities exist in Perth including Perth Motorplex, catering to drag racing and speedway, and Wanneroo Raceway for circuit racing and drifting, which hosts a V8 Supercars round. Perth also has two thoroughbred racing facilities: Ascot, home of the Railway Stakes and Perth Cup; and Belmont Park. Daniel Ricciardo is a Perth-born Formula 1 driver who most recently raced for the McLaren Formula 1 team and is currently the test and reserve driver for Red Bull Racing.

The WACA Ground opened in the 1890s and has hosted Test cricket since 1970. The Western Australian Athletics Stadium opened in 2009.

Infrastructure

Health 

Perth has ten large hospitals with emergency departments. , Royal Perth Hospital in the city centre is the largest, with others spread around the metropolitan area: Armadale Kelmscott District Memorial Hospital, Joondalup Health Campus, King Edward Memorial Hospital for Women in Subiaco, Rockingham General Hospital, Sir Charles Gairdner Hospital in Nedlands, St John of God Murdoch and Subiaco Hospitals, Midland Health Campus in Midland, and Fiona Stanley Hospital in Murdoch. Perth Children's Hospital is the state's only specialist children's hospital, and Graylands Hospital is the only public stand-alone psychiatric teaching hospital. Most of these are public hospitals, with some operating under public-private partnerships. St John of God Murdoch and Subiaco Hospitals, and Hollywood Hospital are large privately owned and operated hospitals.

A number of other public and private hospitals operate in Perth.

Transport 

Perth is served by Perth Airport in the city's east for regional, domestic and international flights and Jandakot Airport in the city's southern suburbs for general aviation and charter flights.

Perth has a road network with three freeways and nine metropolitan highways. The Northbridge tunnel, part of the Graham Farmer Freeway, is the only significant road tunnel in Perth.

Perth metropolitan public transport, including trains, buses and ferries, are provided by Transperth, with links to rural areas provided by Transwa. There are 75 railway stations and 13 bus-only stations on the Transperth network.

Perth provides zero-fare bus and train trips around the city centre (the "Free Transit Zone"), including four high-frequency CAT bus routes.

The Indian Pacific passenger rail service connects Perth with Adelaide and Sydney once per week in each direction. The Prospector passenger rail service connects Perth with Kalgoorlie via several Wheatbelt towns, while the Australind connects to Bunbury, and the AvonLink connects to Northam.

The Fremantle Outer Harbour at Cockburn Sound is one of Australia's major bulk cargo ports.

Utilities 

Perth's electricity is predominantly generated, supplied, and retailed by three Western Australian Government corporations. Verve Energy operates coal and gas power generation stations, as well as wind farms and other power sources. The physical network is maintained by Western Power, while Synergy, the state's largest energy retailer, sells electricity to residential and business customers.

Alinta Energy, which was previously a government owned company, had a monopoly in the domestic gas market since the 1990s. However, in 2013 Kleenheat Gas began operating in the market, allowing consumers to choose their gas retailer.

The Water Corporation is the dominant supplier of water, as well as wastewater and drainage services, in Perth and throughout Western Australia. It is also owned by the state government.

Perth's water supply has traditionally relied on both groundwater and rain-fed dams. Reduced rainfall in the region over recent decades had greatly lowered inflow to reservoirs and affected groundwater levels. Coupled with the city's relatively high growth rate, this led to concerns that Perth could run out of water in the near future. The Western Australian Government responded by building desalination plants, and introducing mandatory household sprinkler restrictions. The Kwinana Desalination Plant was opened in 2006, and Southern Seawater Desalination Plant at Binningup (on the coast between Mandurah and Bunbury) began operating in 2011. A trial winter (1 June – 31 August) sprinkler ban was introduced in 2009 by the State Government, a move which the Government later announced would be made permanent.

See also 
 1955 Plan for the Metropolitan Region, Perth and Fremantle
 List of islands of Perth, Western Australia
 List of Perth suburbs

Notes

References

External links 

 Watch historical footage of Perth and Western Australia from the National Film and Sound Archive of Australia's collection.
 Historical photos of Perth from the State Library of Western Australia
 Tourism Australia Page
 Metropolitan Region Scheme  – The Department of Planning, Lands and Heritage
 Metropolitan Perth LGA boundaries  – The Department of Primary Industries and Regional Development

 
Populated places established in 1829
1829 establishments in Australia
Metropolitan areas of Australia
Australian capital cities